Kill Them with Kindness is the first studio album by the Los Angeles-based indie rock band The Jealous Sound. It was placed 31st on Rolling Stone's "40 Greatest Emo Albums of All Time" list.

Track listing
"Hope for Us" - 4:10
"Naive" - 2:58
"Anxious Arms" - 4:59
"The Fold Out" - 3:10
"The Gift Horse" - 3:39
"Does That Make Sense" - 2:54
"Guard It Closely" - 3:51
"For Once in Your Life" - 3:47
"Abandon! Abandon!" - 3:37
"Troublesome" - 3:30
"Recovery Room" - 6:10
"Above the Waves" - 4:47

References

The Jealous Sound albums
2003 debut albums